The Liuchiu Yu Lighthouse or White Lighthouse is a lighthouse in Liuqiu Township, Pingtung County, Taiwan.

Architecture
The lighthouse is a white round tower standing  in height.

See also

 List of tourist attractions in Taiwan
 List of lighthouses in Taiwan

References

1929 establishments in Taiwan
Lighthouses completed in 1929
Lighthouses in Pingtung County